Beipu is a railway station on the Taiwan Railways Administration (TRA) North-link line located in Xincheng Township, Hualien County, Taiwan.

History
The station was opened on 26 July 1975.

Around the station 
 Chihsing Tan Katsuo Museum
 Dahan Institute of Technology
 Hualien Airport
 Qixingtan Beach

See also 
 List of railway stations in Taiwan

References

1975 establishments in Taiwan
Railway stations in Hualien County
Railway stations opened in 1975
Railway stations served by Taiwan Railways Administration